Horacio de Dios Orzán (born 14 April 1988) is an Argentine footballer who plays as midfielder for Melgar.

References

External links

1988 births
Living people
Sportspeople from Chaco Province
Argentine footballers
Association football midfielders
Sarmiento de Resistencia footballers
Juventud de Las Piedras players
Newell's Old Boys footballers
Club Atlético Tigre footballers
C.D. Universidad Católica del Ecuador footballers
Mushuc Runa S.C. footballers
FBC Melgar footballers
Argentine Primera División players
Ecuadorian Serie A players
Peruvian Primera División players
Expatriate footballers in Ecuador